Frøken Nitouche is a 1963 Danish comedy film directed by Annelise Reenberg and starring Lone Hertz and Dirch Passer. It is based on the operetta Mam'zelle Nitouche.

Cast
 Lone Hertz as Frk. Nitouche / Charlotte Borg
 Dirch Passer as Floridor / Celestin
 Ebbe Langberg as Løjtnant Parsberg
 Hans Kurt as Ritmester Alfred Schmuck
 Else Marie Hansen as Fromme Moder
 Malene Schwartz as Corinna
 Paul Hagen as Rasmus
 Ove Sprogøe as Ferdinand Piper
 Tove Wisborg as Skuespiller
 Beatrice Palner as Actress
 Lili Heglund as Priorindens højre hånd
 Hugo Herrestrup as Løjtnant ved 27. Husarregiment
 Katy Bødtger as Frk. Nitouche / Charlotte Borg (singing voice)
 Arne Seldorf
 Vagn Kramer
 Gunnar Bigum

External links

1963 films
1963 comedy films
Danish comedy films
1960s Danish-language films
Films directed by Annelise Reenberg
Operetta films
Films based on operettas
Films set in the 1880s